Never Enough is the debut studio album by New York City-based band Public Access T.V. The album was released on September 30, 2016 via Cinematic. Several singles were released prior the album, including "In Love and Alone" / "Patti Peru", "On Location", "Sudden Emotion", and "End of an Era". The album has received critical acclaim, garnering four-star reviews from NME, The Guardian, Q Magazine, DIY, Classic Rock, and Dork.

Never Enough was included on both Rough Trade's and NME's lists of top albums of the year, and was also declared one of NME's 10 best debut albums of the year for 2016.

Track listing

References 

2016 debut albums
Public Access T.V. albums